Willi Schreyer (9 September 1914 – 2 May 2002) was an Austrian gymnast. He competed in eight events at the 1948 Summer Olympics.

References

1914 births
2002 deaths
Austrian male artistic gymnasts
Olympic gymnasts of Austria
Gymnasts at the 1948 Summer Olympics
Sportspeople from Salzburg
20th-century Austrian people